Hemileuca electra, the electra buckmoth, is a species of buck or io moth in the family Saturniidae. It is found in Central America and North America.

The MONA or Hodges number for Hemileuca electra is 7736.

Subspecies
 Hemileuca electra clio Barnes & McDunnough, 1918
 Hemileuca electra electra W. G. Wright, 1884
 Hemileuca electra mojavensis Tuskes and McElfresh, 1995

References

Further reading

 
 

Hemileucinae